The Limited was an American clothing retailer that operated retail stores between the early 1960s and the late 2010s. After 2007, it became a brand, originally owned by the private equity firm Sun Capital Partners, now owned by another private equity firm Sycamore Partners.

History
Bella Cabakoff was born in Williamsburg, Brooklyn and moved to Columbus, Ohio as a toddler. At 21, she became the youngest buyer for the Lazarus department store chain. In 1951, after spending over 20 years with Lazarus, she and her husband Harry Wexner opened a women's clothing store named Leslie's (after their son) on State Street. This store became the training ground for Leslie Wexner. In 1963, he borrowed $5,000 from his aunt and $5,000 from the bank and opened a store at the Kingsdale Shopping Center in Upper Arlington. This store was named "The Limited" because the store focused on clothing for younger women, unlike his parents' general merchandise store.  Later in 1964, Bella and Harry closed their store to join their son in his venture.

The original board consisted of only the three family members and longtime friend of Harry and Bella, Jim Waldron (who served as senior vice president): Bella Wexner (who served as secretary until her death in 2001), Harry as chairman (who served until his death in 1975), and Leslie, who succeeded his father as the chairman and later became CEO.  He and his family continue to control 17% of LTD.  In 1969, Wexner took Limited Brands public, listed as LTD on the NYSE.  In 1977, The Limited moved into its main headquarters on Morse Road in Columbus.  In 2009, most headquarters operations moved to New Albany, Ohio.

The 1980s started a string of acquisitions: In 1982, the Victoria's Secret brand, store, and catalogue were purchased from Roy Raymond for $1 million.  Also in 1982, 207 Lane Bryant stores were purchased.  In 1985, the exclusive Henri Bendel store on Fifth Avenue in New York City was purchased for $10 million and 798 Lerner stores for $297 million.  Finally, in 1988, 25 Abercrombie & Fitch stores were purchased for $46 million.  The Limited then ended its ownership of the A&F brand in 1996, when it was spun off into a publicly traded company. In 1980, Limited founded Limited Express, later known simply as Express.

The 1990s included the initial development of the Limited Too (which was renamed Justice in 2008), Bath & Body Works, Structure, and Victoria's Secret Beauty. Galyan's, a sporting goods store, was also purchased. Later in 1998, several Bath & Body Works stores were converted to The White Barn Candle Company stores to begin a home fragrance brand.

On August 3, 2007, Limited Brands transferred 75% ownership of its flagship Limited chain to buyout firm Sun Capital Partners Inc. In 2010, the remaining shares were sold to Sun Capital Partners Inc.

In 2013, Diane Ellis, president and chief operating officer of Brooks Brothers, became the CEO of The Limited. In October 2016, she then left The Limited to join Chico's leaving CFO John Buell to serve as interim CEO.

At the end of 2016, The Limited laid off a significant portion of its corporate workforce and women's fashion brand Altar'd State announced John Buell would be joining their team as CFO. As of the end of 2016, The Limited stores began selling inventory at significant discounts, with some news outlets reporting financial troubles for the chain. In January 2017, The Limited announced that it would be closing all 250 of its stores, cutting 4,000 jobs. At the time of this announcement, the company said it would continue to sell apparel online. On January 17, The Limited announced it was filing for Chapter 11 bankruptcy protection.

In February 2017, the brand was purchased by Sycamore Partners. Belk, Inc., a Southern department store in the Sycamore portfolio, became the exclusive distributor for The Limited in September 2017. The Limited products were again available for purchase through Belk online in October 2017 and via The Limited brand online.

See also
 List of defunct retailers of the United States

References

External links 
 Official The Limited website old — (archived)
 The Limited website

Clothing retailers of the United States
Defunct retail companies of the United States
Companies based in the Columbus, Ohio metropolitan area
American companies established in 1963
Retail companies established in 1963
Retail companies disestablished in 2017
Companies that filed for Chapter 11 bankruptcy in 2017
1963 establishments in Ohio
2017 disestablishments in Ohio
Defunct companies based in Ohio
2007 mergers and acquisitions
Les Wexner